William James Neatby (24 May 1860 – 20 April 1910), often W. J. Neatby, was an English architect, designer and artist. He is best known for his designs of architectural ceramics and was Doulton and Co.'s chief ceramic designer. His standout works include the Meat Hall in Harrods (London), and Everard's Printing Works (Bristol). 
The Modern Style of the Everards Printing Works facade is the largest decorative Doulton Carrara ware tile facade of its kind in Britain (so named from its resemblance to Carrara marble). Neatby was among leading British artists during the late 19th and early 20th century. Ernest Augustus Runtz said of him: "He was a true artist, and a man of fine character, and he pursued his art with a direct and single purpose."

Personal life
William James Neatby was born on 24 May 1860 at Barnsley, Yorkshire. He was the eldest son of Samuel Mossforth Neatby (1837–1910) and Mary Jackson Neatby (1839–1911). W. J. Neatby's grandfather was also named William, and he was the owner of the timber yard in which his father, Samuel, was employed. The family enjoyed relative prosperity and were involved in non-conformist religious life of the town. Not much is known about Neatby's childhood years. He married on 28 May 1881 to Emily Arnold. Neatby's wife Emily, died in August 1885. He married again in October 1887 to Jane Isabella Dempster. Neatby died on 20 April 1910 aged 49.

Edward  Mossforth Neatby
Edward Mossforth Neatby (1888–1949) was William's son. He was born in Leeds  and became  a  well-known artist of landscapes and portraits. Some of his portraits are held  in the Royal Air Force Museum. Edward Mossforth Neatby died in  Harrogate in 1949.

Career

Burmantofts Potteries
In 1903 The Studio writes: "No sooner had he left school than Mr Neatby, at that time only a boy of 15 years, was articled to an architect in a northern provincial town. There he remained, as pupil and afterwards as clerk of the works, altogether six years." Aged 21 and newly married Neatby decided to change his career's direction. He was employed by Burmantofts Pottery at Leeds as a designer. It appears he started working at Burmantofts around spring 1884 and his initials "W.J.N" appear on illustration titled "A few Pilaster Panels in Burmantofts Faience by Wilcock and Co. Burmantofs". While working for Burmantofs, he was the companies leading artist in catalogue design for the company, in the period from 1884 to 1890.

Neatby's years at Burmantofts Potteries were very productive and he gained a lot of experience, particularly when it comes to architectural ceramics, field in which he will excel at. Architect Ernest Runtz praised him: "As an architect one had only to indicate the general idea of a decorative feature, whether in modelling or in mural decorative work, and Neatby caught the spirit of the undertaking..."

Royal Doulton

With a lot of experience behind him Neatby was on the move. In 1890 he went to London to work for Royal Doulton, and he was in charge of Doulton's architectural department for the design and production of mural ceramics. In the 11 years Neatby has spent at Doulton's he worked at significant number of major architectural projects. Neatby designed several ornamental architectural details for locally famous building  at Cornhill 54–55, known as "Cornhill Devils". He also worked on Board School building (now Salford Education Offices) in Chapel Street, Salford, but probably his most prestigious project is when as the principal sculptor involved, he created terracotta sculpted bas relief panels for the New Physical Observatory at the Royal Observatory, Greenwich. His previous experience as tile designer was essential for his work at Winter Gardens, Blackpool where he designed decoration for the entrance corridor and main ballroom. He experimented with new ceramic materials and developed Doulton's Carrara ware and Parian ware. Carrara ware is named so from its resemblance to Carrara marble, and Everard's Printing Works facade by Neatby is the largest decorative Doulton Carrara ware tile facade of its kind in Britain. Neatby preferred to use Carrara ware tiles for exterior, but notable exception where he used it in interior, to great effect, is Meat Hall at Harrods in London.

Independent artist
In 1899 Neatby became member of the Society of Designers. Numerous members ran independent design practices which may have inspired Neatby to set up his own. While Society of Designers and freedom that independent designers had have certainly contributed to Neatby taking the same path, that freedom was not the sole driving force behind Neatby's decision. He had wide range of interests that he wanted to pursue, with painting being the main art form.

References 

The Hidden Artists of Barnsley, Chapter 13. William James Neatby Artist and Designer and Edward Mossforth Neatby. Barnlsey at Your Doorstep

External links

1860 births
1910 deaths
English architects
English designers
English artists
19th-century English architects